Schleswig-Holstein is a Brandenburg-class frigate of the German Navy.

Construction and commissioning
Schleswig-Holstein and the three other frigates of the Brandenburg class were designed as replacements for the Hamburg-class destroyers. She was laid in 1993 at the yards of Howaldtswerke-Deutsche Werft, Kiel and launched in June 1994. After undergoing trials, she was commissioned on 24 November 1995, and assigned to 6. Fregattengeschwader. After the naval structure was reorganised, Schleswig-Holstein was assigned to 2. Fregattengeschwader, based at Wilhelmshaven.

Service
Schleswig-Holstein was deployed as part of the Maritime Task Force of the United Nations Interim Force in Lebanon between September and December 2009, serving as the flagship of the taskforce commander,  Flotilla Admiral . On 19 May 2010 she replaced the frigate Emden on deployment with Operation Atalanta off the Horn of Africa. She spent 124 days with the taskforce there, and together with the EUNAVFOR flagship De Grasse, was involved in escorting ships from the World Food Program and the African Union Mission in Somalia. Schleswig-Holstein was replaced in this task by the frigate Köln in September 2010.

The Cape Ray was carrying out the destruction of Syrian chemical weapons.

From June to November 2015 Schleswig-Holstein was deployed with the EU Navfor Med mission in the Mediterranean, assisting in rescuing migrants from shipwrecks and other dangerous situations. On 22 July she rescued 111 people. On 24 August a pregnant Somali woman rescued from a refugee boat by  gave birth to a child aboard the ship, the first to ever be born aboard a ship of the German Navy. At the suggestion of the attending medical personnel, the child was named Sophia. This was a name associated with German naval ships named Schleswig-Holstein, as the earlier destroyer Schleswig-Holstein had used the radio call sign "Sophie X". This was itself a reference to the early battleship , which had been dedicated to Princess Louise Sophie of Schleswig-Holstein-Sonderburg-Augustenburg, as have later ships of the name. EUNAVFORMED was subsequently renamed "Operation Sophia", after the baby born aboard Schleswig-Holstein. After participating in the rescue of a total of 4,224 shipwrecked refugees Schleswig-Holstein  returned to her home port of Wilhelmshaven on 9 November 2015.

References

External links

Brandenburg-class frigates
1994 ships
Ships built in Kiel
Frigates of Germany